Undoolya may refer to

Acacia undoolyana, known as Undoolya wattle
Undoolya, Northern Territory, a suburb in Australia
Undoolya Station, a pastoral lease in Australia